Edappadi Rajagopal Krishnan (21 April 1922 – 13 May 1998) was an Indian politician from the All India Anna Dravida Munnetra Kazhagam.

Family 

Krishnan was to E. Rajagopal. He served as a member of the Tamil Nadu Legislative Assembly from 1967 to 1971, Lok Sabha from 1971 to 1977 and the Rajya Sabha from 18 July 1977 to 2 April 1980.

References 

 

1922 births
1998 deaths
India MPs 1971–1977
Lok Sabha members from Tamil Nadu
People from Salem district
Rajya Sabha members from Tamil Nadu